Michael D. Coogan is lecturer on Hebrew Bible/Old Testament at Harvard Divinity School, Director of Publications for the Harvard Semitic Museum, editor-in-chief of Oxford Biblical Studies Online, and professor emeritus of religious studies at Stonehill College. He has also taught at Fordham University, Boston College, Wellesley College, and the University of Waterloo (Ontario). Coogan has also participated in and directed archaeological excavations in Israel, Jordan, Cyprus, and Egypt, and has lectured widely.

Education and honors
Coogan was raised as Roman Catholic and for 10 years was a Jesuit.

Coogan holds a doctorate in Near Eastern Languages and Literatures from Harvard University, 1971. In 2000, he received Stonehill's Distinguished Faculty Award in recognition of his scholarship and teaching.

Author
One of the leading biblical scholars in the United States, he is the author of The Old Testament: A Historical and Literary Introduction to the Hebrew Scriptures; editor of The New Oxford Annotated Bible, The Oxford Encyclopedia of the Books of the Bible, and Oxford Biblical Studies Online; and a contributor to such standard reference works as The Encyclopedia of Religion, HarperCollins Bible Dictionary, and The New Jerome Biblical Commentary. Other projects that he conceived, edited, and collaborated on include The Oxford Companion to the Bible, The Illustrated Guide to World Religions, and The Oxford History of the Biblical World. One work is published by Twelve Books and titled God and Sex: What the Bible Really Says, published in 2010. In the later, Coogan aims to expand human freedom and justice while giving secondary instruction to Christians on the proper use of the Bible. He quotes St. Paul in regard to the failure to mention the female disciples in the list of faithful who saw the Risen Christ by noting that the empty tomb story in the Gospels might be a myth and inserted later. He states, "The text is not, except perhaps in the abstract, intrinsically authoritative: it derives its authority from the community." He favors "thinking of the Bible in a more nuanced way than simply as the literal word of God" and identifies the Bible as "one foundational text in American society" which along with our Constitution must be interpreted critically. The purpose of "God and Sex" is weaved jointly with the faithful and the secular in mind.

Appearances
 Coogan was featured in The Bible's Buried Secrets and Secrets of Noah's Ark from PBS's NOVA series. The first documentary investigated the origins of the ancient Israelites, the evolution of their belief in one God, and the creation of the Bible.
 Coogan appeared in the History Channel documentary, Secrets of Noah's Ark.
 Coogan also appeared in the National Geographic Channel's documentary, "The Truth Behind the Ark."

References

Sources
 Coogan, Michael (2010) God and Sex: What the Bible Really Says. New York: Twelve. Hachette Book Group. .

External links
 Oxford Biblical Studies Online

  Michael Coogan - What I Wanna Know, Aug 13, 2011.  Interview of Michael Coogan by Ryan Kohls
 

1942 births
Living people
American biblical scholars
Old Testament scholars
Harvard Divinity School faculty
Fordham University alumni
Harvard Graduate School of Arts and Sciences alumni